Sharmila Anandasabapathy is a Sri Lankan-American physician and researcher in the field of gastrointestinal cancer. She is a professor of medicine in gastroenterology and serves as director of Baylor Global Health and vice president at the Baylor College of Medicine.

Education 
Anandasabapathy pursued a Bachelor of Arts degree in English literature from Yale University. She earned her doctor of medicine (M.D.) degree from the Albert Einstein College of Medicine.

Career 
Anandasabapathy was an intern and resident at the New York-Presbyterian Hospital's Weill Cornell Medical Center and Memorial Sloan Kettering Cancer Center for three years. In 2004, she completed her gastroenterology fellowship at Mount Sinai Medical and did advanced training in the endoscopic management of Barrett's esophagus and esophageal cancer. After the fellowship, she joined the faculty at Mount Sinai School of Medicine. She was also a faculty member at the M.D. Anderson Cancer Center for three years between 2005 and 2008. After that, she served as Chief of Endoscopy till 2013 at Mount Sinai Medical Center. Since then, she has been a professor of medicine in gastroenterology at the Baylor College of Medicine. She is also the vice president and director of Baylor Global Health, where she oversees international programs.

Medical practice 
Anandasabapathy practices gastroenterology and endoscopy as an attending physician at Baylor-St. Luke's Medical Center. Prior to this, she was attending physician at Mount Sinai Medical Center and the M.D. Anderson Medical Center.

Research 
Anandasabapathy's research is focused on the diagnosis and treatment of gastrointestinal cancer using innovative technologies. She has been the principal investigator on multiple grants funded by the National Institutes of Health and National Cancer Institute, through which she has led various clinical trials for the diagnosis of esophageal and gastric cancer. Anandasabapathy has published numerous papers and articles in various journals about gastroenterology and cancer. She has also been involved in the development of guidelines for Barrett's esophagus, which were published in June 2013.

Anandasabapathy's publications and research have been used in advanced imaging technologies for the detection of gastrointestinal cancers.

In 2018, Anandasabapathy and her team at Baylor College of Medicine developed the Emergency Smart Pod, a “rapidly deployable, expandable shipping container-based unit.” It was designed for the management of outbreaks and emergencies globally.

Awards and recognition 
Anandasabapathy was named as one of the "Women on the move" by the Texas Medical Center in 2017. She was featured as USAID female innovator and Influential Women on Houston on International Women's Week. She is also chair of the AGA Women's Committee and associate editor of Gastrointestinal Endoscopy.

References 

Living people
American women physicians
Yale College alumni
Baylor College of Medicine alumni
Albert Einstein College of Medicine alumni
Year of birth missing (living people)
American people of Sri Lankan Tamil descent